Yelbulak-Matveyevka (Yılbolaq-Matveyevka) is a rural locality (a selo) in Bizhbulyaksky Selsoviet, Bizhbulyaksky District, Bashkortostan, Russia. The population was 371 as of 2010. There are 3 streets.

Geography 
Yelbulak-Matveyevka is located 8 km southwest of Bizhbulyak (the district's administrative centre) by road. Pchelnik is the nearest rural locality.

References 

Rural localities in Bizhbulyaksky District